Sunny Deol (born 19 October 1956) is an Indian actor, director and producer having acted in over 100 films in Bollywood, who was highly successful in the 1990s and has earned various accolades including two National Film Awards and Filmfare Awards.

Deol debuted in his father's production Betaab (1983) directed by Rahul Rawail, which was a commercial success. It was followed by numerous roles in some other films of that decade including Arjun (1985), Sultanat (1986) and Dacait (1987). In 1989, his role as a police officer in Tridev was highlighted and he also appeared in ChaalBaaz; both were among the top 5 highest earning films of the year.

Deol appeared in the lead role of a boxer in another of his father's productions Ghayal, directed by debutante Rajkumar Santoshi, which became the year's second top-grossing film. It established and won him the Filmfare Award for Best Actor and National Film Award for Best Actor. In 1993, Deol reunited with Santoshi to play an alcoholic lawyer in the highly successful social drama Damini and was awarded the Filmfare Award and National Film Award for Best Supporting Actor. That year, his character of an lieutenant army officer in Yash Chopra's psychological thriller Darr earned him a Filmfare Award for Best Actor nomination. His films in 1994 and 1995 were commercially unsuccessful, but in 1996 he appeared as a criminal in Raj Kanwar's action film Jeet. He also worked with Santoshi a third time in Ghatak (1996). Though his 1998 film Salaakhen was not well reviewed, Deol was critically acclaimed for his role. Three years later, he produced and directed his brother's starrer Dillagi (1999), in which he had a lead role too, but the film failed to gain success.

In 2001, Deol featured as a Sikh truck driver who loves a Muslim woman in Anil Sharma's patriotic action drama portraying the India-Pakistan partition of 1947, Gadar: Ek Prem Katha, opposite Amisha Patel. The film became the highest-grossing Hindi film up until then in mainstream cinema earning over  worldwide and he was nominated for Filmfare Award for Best Actor once again. In the same year, he worked in another highly successful action thriller film Indian (2001). He went on to appear in several films co-starring his father and brother, such as Apne (2007) and the Yamla Pagla Deewana film series (2011–18). In 2016, Deol directed and starred in a sequel to Ghayal. He launched and directed his elder son as an actor in the romantic thriller Pal Pal Dil Ke Paas (2019).

Films

Notes

See also
 List of awards and nominations received by Sunny Deol

References

External links
 

Indian filmographies
Male actor filmographies
Director filmographies